Giles Duley (born 15 September 1971 in Wimbledon, London) is an English portrait and documentary photographer, writer, CEO and presenter. Duley also cooks, and writes about food and food politics, under the moniker The One Armed Chef. He is best known for his work documenting the long term impact of war. He is the founder and CEO of the NGO Legacy of War Foundation and an activist for the rights of those living with disability.

Biography

The rock & roll years 
Duley started his career as a music photographer after studying at Arts University Bournemouth (though he only completed the first year). During the 1990s he worked for publications such as Select, Q, Esquire, GQ and Arena, particularly photographing the Britpop movement. He worked with Oasis, the Prodigy, the Charlatans, Underworld and Pulp. He also photographed numerous international artists including Mariah Carey, Marilyn Manson, Lenny Kravitz and the Black Crowes.

In 2000 Q Magazine voted his portrait on Marilyn Manson among the greatest rock photos of all time.

Documentary photography and photojournalism 
In 2000 Duley gave up music photography to pursue his passion for documentary photography on a full-time basis. Concentrating on lesser known humanitarian issues and the consequences of conflict on civilians, he worked with many respected organizations including MAG, UNHCR, Emergency and Médecins Sans Frontières in countries including South Sudan, Nigeria, Congo, Kenya, Angola, Bangladesh and Ukraine.

In 2010 his work was nominated for an Amnesty International Media Award and he was a winner at the PX3 - Prix de Paris.

Afghanistan and injury 
In 2011, whilst on foot patrol with the US 75th Cavalry Regiment in Afghanistan, Duley stepped on an improvised explosive device (IED). He was severely injured, losing both legs and his left arm. It was only the quick response by the medic on patrol and the medevac crew that saved his life.
He was treated in Queen Elizabeth Hospital Birmingham where he spent 45 days in the intensive care unit nearly succumbing to his injuries on more than one occasion. After several months and multiple operations Duley began his rehabilitation at DMRC Headley Court.

2012–present 
In 2012 Duley returned to work. In October 2012 he documented the war surgery hospital run by EMERGENCY in Kabul. This led to the Channel 4 programme Walking Wounded: Return to the Frontline. Despite his injuries Duley has continued to document the long-term impact of conflict. This work is part of his Legacy of War project.
In 2015 he was commissioned by UNHCR to document the refugee crisis across the middle east and Europe. This year long project produced the exhibition and book – I Can Only Tell You What My Eyes See.
Duley has collaborated with various musicians including Massive Attack and PJ Harvey.

He has presented documentaries for Channel 4's Unreported World and in 2022 presented and produced six episodes of The One Armed Chef for VICE TV.

Humanitarian and charity work 
In 2017 Duley founded Legacy of War Foundation, a charity working with survivors of conflict. He is currently the CEO and in this role campaigns for the rights of those living with disabilities caused by conflict. In 2021 he launched their No More War campaign with a video co-produced by Robert Del Naja.

Duley is also an advocate for inclusivity in the creative industry, most especially within TV and photography.

Honours and awards 
Duley is a recipient of both the May Chidiac Award for Bravery in Journalism and the AIB Founders Award for Outstanding Achievement, and was awarded an Honorary master's degree in Photography from the University of Arts, Bournemouth.
The film Walking Wounded: Return to the Frontline, won the Association for International Broadcasting (AIB) Award for Best International Current Affairs Documentary (2013) and the Foreign Press Association Award for TV Documentary Story of the Year (2013).
In 2013 Duley received an Honorary Fellowship from the Royal Photographic Society which is given ′to distinguished persons having, from their position or attainments, an intimate connection with the science or fine art of photography or the application thereof′.
In 2015 he was awarded the Women on the Move media award for his work highlighting the plight of Syrian refugees in Lebanon.
In 2017 he was made an honorary citizen of Palermo by mayor Leoluca Orlando. In 2019 he won an Amnesty International UK Media Award for his project "We are Only Here Because We Are Strong".

Quotes 
 "I thought, 'Right hand? Eyes?'"—he realized that all of these were intact—"and I thought, 'I can work.'" Giles Duley, NYT
 It (loss of three limbs) is going to give me greater insight and empathy into people's suffering and hopefully put me in a better position to tell their stories. Because that's all I am, a storyteller." - Giles Duley, Becoming the Story.
 "These photographs remind us of our humanity and of the need for understanding and compassion if we want a peaceful world and a just one. The great English poet John Donne once wrote "No man is an island.....  any man's death diminishes me, because I am involved in mankind, and therefore never send to know for whom the bell tolls; it tolls for thee." What he said in words Duley's compelling photographs tell us in pictures. They are a must for anyone who values the unity, tragedy and potential of the human condition."   - Lord Ashdown
 "Different photographers can use the same camera or light, or all shoot the same frame. But what is different is the soul of the person behind the lens, and the moments they recognize and are drawn to—the emotional connection they make. That is what I love about Giles’s photography. Looking at his images, we can feel what he feels. It’s clear that he connects deeply to the human condition of people from all over the world. He himself has been through an ordeal. They say that adversity helps grow compassion, and Giles’s art certainly seems to bear that out." - Angelina Jolie''

References

External links 
 

1971 births
Living people
English photojournalists
Documentary photographers
Alumni of Arts University Bournemouth